Bissett Water Aerodrome  is a aerodrome located adjacent to Bissett, Manitoba, Canada.

References

Registered aerodromes in Manitoba
Seaplane bases in Manitoba

Transport in Eastman Region, Manitoba